Gerstenmaier is a German surname. Notable people with the surname include:

Eugen Gerstenmaier (1906–1986), German Evangelical theologian, resistance fighter and politician
William H. Gerstenmaier (born 1954), Former Associate Administrator for Human Exploration and Operations for NASA

German-language surnames